The Stetson House is a historic house at Hanover Street in Hanover, Massachusetts. The -story frame house was built c. 1694 by Samuel "Drummer" Stetson and was occupied by the Stetson family until at least the 1860s. During the 19th century the family opened the house for religious services after the church burned down.

Description and history 
In the Common room there is a large fireplace (one of six in the house) and a Yule log that was  lit for good luck on Christmas but was never allowed to burn all the way. At the church, if you fell asleep a person would tickle you with a feather attached to a tithing rod. It was above the fireplace. A grandfather clock made by John Bailey and given to the Stetson house was too big to fit in the house so they had to cut a depression in the floor. The mother Stetson sometimes baked pies in the deep oven and at about 4:00pm called the children to supper.

People donated furniture for the Music Room. Also in the Music room there is a portrait of John Barstow and his wife Betsy Ellen. Four front windows have special glass, each with 24 panes. The dining room is not used often, only on special occasions like Christmas or Thanksgiving.

The doors between the rooms were made crooked on purpose so that they would close by themselves and not let the heat out. Most of the rooms were not heated and foot warmers were used in the winter.
The Stetson House now acts as a museum for the town of Hanover, with its rooms being dedicated to the towns agricultural, manufacturing, maritime, and military histories. 
The house was listed on the National Register of Historic Places in 1979, and included in the Hanover Center Historic District in 1996.

See also
National Register of Historic Places listings in Plymouth County, Massachusetts

References

Houses completed in 1716
Houses in Plymouth County, Massachusetts
Hanover, Massachusetts
National Register of Historic Places in Plymouth County, Massachusetts
Historic district contributing properties in Massachusetts
Houses on the National Register of Historic Places in Plymouth County, Massachusetts
1716 establishments in Massachusetts